Kenly is a town in Johnston and Wilson counties in the U.S. state of North Carolina. It was named for John R. Kenly, Northern Division Superintendent of the Atlantic Coast Line Railroad, who later became president of the railroad in 1913. The population was 1,339 at the 2010 census, down from 1,569 in  2000.

History
The community was settled in about 1875, developing along the "Short-Cut" rail line of the Wilmington and Weldon Railroad. It was incorporated in 1887 as Kenly, being named for railroad official J. R. Kenly. In 1897, the community's first school, Kenly Academy, a private boarding institution, was established. Kenly High School, a public institution, was opened in 1914. That year the town received its first electric service.

In July 2022, all five members of Kenly's police force resigned, citing a "hostile work environment", allegedly created by the newly-appointed town manager.

Geography
Kenly is located in eastern Johnston County. A small portion of the town extends into the southwest corner of Wilson County. U.S. Route 301 (Church Street) is the main road through the center of town. North Carolina Highway 222 (Second Street) crosses US 301 in the center of Kenly. Interstate 95 runs along the northwest edge of Kenly, with access from Exit 107 (US 301).

Demographics

2020 census

As of the 2020 United States census, there were 1,491 people, 744 households, and 416 families residing in the town.

2000 census
As of the census of 2000, there were 1,569 people, 671 households, and 414 families residing in the town. The population density was 1,035.1 people per square mile (398.5/km2). There were 754 housing units at an average density of 497.4 per square mile (191.5/km2). The racial makeup of the town was 55.32% White, 40.60% African American, 0.25% Native American, 0.25% Asian, 2.29% from other races, and 1.27% from two or more races. Hispanic or Latino of any race were 3.57% of the population.

There were 671 households, out of which 32.0% had children under the age of 18 living with them, 36.8% were married couples living together, 20.0% had a female householder with no husband present, and 38.2% were non-families. 34.6% of all households were made up of individuals, and 13.9% had someone living alone who was 65 years of age or older. The average household size was 2.34 and the average family size was 3.02.

In the town, the population was spread out, with 28.1% under the age of 18, 8.5% from 18 to 24, 29.1% from 25 to 44, 20.4% from 45 to 64, and 13.9% who were 65 years of age or older. The median age was 36 years. For every 100 females, there were 90.4 males. For every 100 females age 18 and over, there were 82.8 males.

The median income for a household in the town was $20,865, and the median income for a family was $33,214. Males had a median income of $24,250 versus $17,917 for females. The per capita income for the town was $14,181. About 23.3% of families and 25.2% of the population were below the poverty line, including 26.5% of those under age 18 and 19.3% of those age 65 or over.

Arts and culture
Boyette Slave House was listed on the National Register of Historic Places in 1979.

Education
 Glendale-Kenly Elementary
 North Johnston High School

Notable people
Al Evans, Major League Baseball player
The O'Kaysions

Culture
Kenly is the home of the Eastern North Carolina Church of God (Cleveland, Tennessee) State Executive Offices and Conference Center.

References

Works cited

External links

 Town of Kenly official website

Towns in Johnston County, North Carolina
Towns in Wilson County, North Carolina
Towns in North Carolina